Plurellidae is a family of tunicates belonging to the order Phlebobranchia, and was first described by P. Kott in 1973.

Genera:
 Microgastra Kott, 1985
 Plurella Kott, 1973

References

Tunicates